Savar River may refer to:

 Sävar River, a river in Sweden
 Pârâul Domnului or Savar River, a river in Romania